Louise de Brézé (1521-1577), Duchess of Aumale and Dame d'Anet, was a French noblewoman of the 16th century, the second daughter of Diane de Poitiers and Louis de Brézé.

Biography
Louise was born to the influential Norman landowner Louis de Brézé, Governor and Grand Seneschal of Normandy, and his wife Diane de Poitiers. Diane would later become the mistress of Henry II of France, a role which gave her immense power and privileges. Louise's older sister was Françoise de Brézé (ca. 1518-1577).

In 1547, Louise married Claude, Duke of Aumale, a member of the powerful House of Lorraine and son of Claude, Duke of Guise. Socially, Louise and the Brézés were the inferiors to the Guises. Gaspard II de Coligny tried to dissuade the Guises from the match, stating that "it was not very honorable for them and that it was worth more to have an inch of authority and favor with honor, than an armful without honor." However, the match gave the Guises the opportunity to strengthen their alliance with Diane, which thus ensured that they would remain in favor with the King.

Part of Louise's dowry included the Barony of Mauny, near Rouen. Upon the death of Diane in 1566, her immense estates were divided between Louise and Françoise. Louise inherited the Château d'Anet and its estate. In the 1560s, the Duke and Duchess of Aumale expanded their land holdings in Normandy, buying the countship of Maulévrier, the barony of Bec-Crespin, and other estates. This made Claude one of the greatest landowners in Upper Normandy by the late 1560s. The financial difficulties of Louise's nephew, Henri Robert de la Marck, gave the couple an opportunity to obtain land from Françoise's share of the Brézé inheritance.

Louise and Claude had at least 7 children.

 Henri de Lorraine, Comte de Saint Vallier, died at age 10 in 1559.
 Charles, Duke of Aumale (1566-1631); married Marie de Lorraine.
 Claude, Chevalier d'Aumale & Abbé du Bec (d. 1591).
 Catherine; married, in 1569, Nicholas de Lorraine, Duc de Mercœur.
 Dianne; married, in 1576, François de Luxembourg, Comte de Roucy.
 Antoinette-Louise de Lorraine, Abbesse de Notre-Dame de Soissons.
 Marie de Lorraine, Abbesse de Chelles.

Louise was widowed after Claude was killed by a cannonball on August 1, 1573, during the Siege of La Rochelle. Louise transferred ownership of Anet to her son Charles at the time of his marriage in 1576.

References

1521 births
1577 deaths
16th-century French women
16th-century French people
House of Lorraine
House of Guise
French nobility